The Davenport Locomotive Works, of Davenport, Iowa, USA was formed as the W W Whitehead Company in 1901. In 1902 the company commenced building light locomotives. The Company was renamed the Davenport Locomotive Works in 1904.

In late 1930 Davenport was licensed to assemble and market R G LeTourneau Inc products under the Davenport-LeTourneau brand. The agreement is believed to have ended in 1935 when LeTourneau’s moved to Peoria, Illinois. Davenport also sold Davenport-Winchell three-wheel roller conversions of industrial wheel tractors, Davenport-Frink snow plows which were built in license from Frink Sno-Plows Inc and Reynolds patented Mov-Mor rotary scrapers.

In 1933 the company was again restructured and renamed the Davenport-Besler Corporation which continued in business until 1956.  William George Besler was a Director at the time of the restructuring. The company acquired the locomotive business of H. K. Porter, Inc in 1950 and from then on produced Porter designs as well as its own.

The company built small steam locomotives early on; the first gasoline-fueled internal combustion engined locomotive was built in 1924 and the first diesel locomotive in 1927, a  diesel-electric for the Northern Illinois Coal Company of Boonville, Indiana.

An extensive range of diesel locomotives in all industrial sizes followed, utilizing either mechanical torque converter or electric transmission, the former for the smaller locomotives.  Most were used by a variety of industrial users, but some railroads also bought Davenport locomotives, particularly of the  size, that being the largest locomotive then allowed by union rules to be operated by one man.  Railroad buyers included the Rock Island, Milwaukee Road, Santa Fe, the Frisco, and the Missouri Pacific. In 1963, that rule was relaxed and railroads ceased buying industrial-sized locomotives for light switching.

Three Davenport 500 HP locomotives (built 1952) of the State Railway of Thailand are still in service as of April 2018.

Various Davenport locomotives are preserved in the US as well as other parts of the world.

The Canadian Locomotive Company acquired Davenport-Besler in 1955, closing it the following year.

Preservation

 Davenport #1597 Kiama  a 0-4-0 T Locomotive of 1917 at the Illawarra Light Railway Museum
 Davenport-Besler #2245 - a 30 ton  gauge 0-4-0 Diesel switcher of 1937 at the Colorado Railroad Museum
 Davenport #2240 30 ton  0-6-0 Switcher, 1936, used on the US Construction Railroad during the construction of the Hoover Dam and kept at the Nevada State Railroad Museum, Boulder City, Nevada

 Davenport Locomotive Narrow Gauge (painted Wayne County Roads No 7) is on display at the John D. Dingell Transit Center in Dearborn, Michigan.

References

External links

 Preserved Davenport locomotives

Defunct locomotive manufacturers of the United States
 
Davenport, Iowa
Industrial buildings and structures in Iowa